FK Vėtra was a Lithuanian football team from the capital city of Vilnius.

History 

The club was founded in 1997 and was initially based in Rūdiškės, a settlement in Trakai district, and moved in 2003 to Vilnius city with the purchase of its own stadium.

In 2004, Vėtra played in the Intertoto Cup and reached the 3rd round with 3 wins, 2 draws, and 1 loss, including the elimination of Scottish side Hibernian FC.

Their results in the 2005 tournament were not as successful, being eliminated in the early stages by losing both first round matches to future finalists CFR Cluj. In 2006, Vėtra played Shelbourne F.C. of Dublin in the UEFA Intertoto Cup, but lost 0–1 at home, and 0–4 in Ireland.

In the 2007 Intertoto Cup, Vėtra's second-round game with Legia Warsaw was called off when Legia fans rioted. The scoreline was 2–0 to Vėtra at the time, and on July 11, UEFA decided to award the tie 3–0 to Vėtra, and expel Legia from the competition. Vėtra lost to English side Blackburn Rovers in the third round. .

In the 2008 edition of the UEFA Cup Vėtra lost to Viking Stavanger despite winning the first leg thanks to a bizarre goal.

In July 2009 Vėtra became the first Lithuanian club to progress in a European knock-out match after losing its first game at home. In the second qualifying round of the UEFA Europa League Vėtra lost 0–1 to HJK Helsinki but defeated their opponents 3–1 to earn a tie against Fulham FC. Vetra lost 3–0 at home and the same away, which means they were knocked out by Fulham.

The team played in the Lithuanian Premier division A Lyga but in summer of 2010 was expelled by Lithuanian Football Federation for financial troubles and debts to players, coaches and other club staff.

Achievements 
A Lyga 2nd placed: 2009
LFF Cup runners-up: 2003, 2005, 2008, 2010 (finalist)

Notable players
Players who have either appeared for their respective national team at any time or received an individual award while at the club.

 Darvydas Šernas
 Andrius Skerla
 Mindaugas Panka
 Artūras Rimkevičius
 Georgas Freidgeimas
 Valdemar Borovskij
 Artūras Žulpa
 Tomas Mikuckis
 Artjom Dmitrijev
 Tomas Ražanauskas
 Donatas Vencevičius
 Serhiy Kuznetsov
 Igoris Kirilovas
 Vidas Alunderis

Participation in Lithuanian Championships 
 2003 – 3rd
 2004 – 5th
 2005 – 4th
 2006 – 3rd
 2007 – 5th
 2008 – 3rd
 2009 – 2nd
 2010 – expelled from league after the round 17

Participation in European tournaments

References 

Defunct football clubs in Lithuania
Association football clubs disestablished in 2010
FK Vėtra
1997 establishments in Lithuania